Robert Giard (July 22, 1939 - July 16, 2002) was an American portrait, landscape, and figure photographer.

Life
A native of Hartford, Connecticut, Giard majored in English literature and received a B.A. from Yale University in 1961, then an M.A. in Comparative Literature from Boston University in 1965. For a time he taught intermediate grades at the New Lincoln School. By 1972, he began to photograph, concentrating on landscapes of the South Fork of Long Island, portraits of friends, many of them artists and writers in the region, and the nude figure.
 
In 1974, Giard settled in Amagansett, Long Island, with his life partner, Jonathan Silin, an early childhood educator, where they remained for nearly thirty years until Giard's death. In the beginning years of his career, Giard did much of his landscape photography during the late autumn, winter, and early spring when many of the fashionable houses of the Hamptons were boarded up for the season.

Career
Ultimately, it would be in the area of the formal portrait that Giard¹s career made its most indelible mark. In 1985, after seeing a performance of Larry Kramer¹s The Normal Heart dealing with the crisis
of AIDS, Giard set about documenting in straightforward, unadorned, yet sometimes witty and playful portraits, a wide survey of significant gay and lesbian literary lights. His portraits included such iconic figures as Edward Albee, Allen Ginsberg, and Adrienne Rich, as well as emerging novelists making their first mark, including Sapphire, David Leavitt, Shay Youngblood, and Michael Cunningham. A selection of these portraits, culled from the five hundred examples he had by then already amassed, was published by MIT Press in 1997 as the anthology Particular Voices: Portraits of Gay and Lesbian Writers, which then served as the companion volume to the New York Public Library's 1998 exhibition of the same name.
 
At the time of his death in July, 2002, just shy of his 63rd birthday, Giard was working on a portrait documentation of the three hundred twenty-one grant recipients from around the country of the Thanks Be To Grandmother Winifred Foundation, which until 2001 supported projects by women fifty-four years and older that benefited other mature women. Grants supported research and artistic projects, as well
as efforts to alleviate social, economic, and medical problems for women in a given locality. Giard, traveling the country by train, bus, and plane (he never had a driver¹s license) succeeded in photographing two hundred forty-one of the women grantees, and kept a journal of his travels and his many visits to a richly diverse group of American women in small towns and major cities.

Robert Giard was the recipient of many grants and awards, and the published version of Particular Voices won a Lambda Literary Foundation Award for Best Photography/Art Book in 1997. Giard had a long and distinguished solo and group exhibition career throughout the United States. Examples of his work are in collections of Brooklyn Museum, San Francisco Public Library, New York Public Library, and the Library of Congress. Giard¹s complete archive, including work books and ephemera, is now housed in the American Collection of the Beinecke Rare Book and Manuscript Library at Yale University.

Legacy
The Robert Giard Foundation was formed in 2002 with the aim of preserving his photographic legacy, promoting his work for educational purposes, and encouraging the work of young photographers.   The annual Robert Giard Fellowship is a $10,000 grant to visual artists whose work addresses sexuality, gender, and issues of gay, lesbian, bisexual and transgender identity.

References

External links
Robert Giard Papers. Yale Collection of American Literature, Beinecke Rare Book and Manuscript Library.
"Larry Kramer and Molly, NYC" Portrait, Library of Congress
Robert Giard Photographs Collection, San Francisco Public Library
Robert Giard Holdings, Brooklyn Museum
10th Annual Lambda Literary Awards Homepage
The Robert Giard Foundation

1939 births
2002 deaths
American LGBT photographers
American gay artists
American portrait photographers
Artists from Hartford, Connecticut
People from Amagansett, New York
Photographers from Connecticut
Photographers from New York (state)
20th-century American photographers
Yale University alumni
Boston University College of Arts and Sciences alumni
20th-century American LGBT people